The Gainbridge LPGA at Boca Rio is a women's professional golf tournament in Florida on the LPGA Tour. Originally, Gainbridge had sponsored a tournament at the Indianapolis Motor Speedway from 2017 to 2019, it was moved to Florida in 2020 and played in Boca Raton at Boca Rio Golf Club.

Winners

Tournament records

References

External links
Coverage on the LPGA Tour's official site
Boca Rio Golf Club – golf information

LPGA Tour events
Golf in Florida
Recurring sporting events established in 2020
2020 establishments in Florida
Women's sports in Florida